Martin Damm and Cyril Suk were the defending champions and won in the final 7–5, 7–6(7–4) against Donald Johnson and Leander Paes.

Seeds
Champion seeds are indicated in bold text while text in italics indicates the round in which those seeds were eliminated.

 Donald Johnson /  Leander Paes (final)
 Martin Damm /  Cyril Suk (champions)
 František Čermák /  Leoš Friedl (quarterfinals)
 Tomáš Cibulec /  Pavel Vízner (semifinals)

Draw

External links
 2003 Ordina Open Men's Doubles Draw

Men's Doubles
Doubles